The Irish Race Conventions were a disconnected series of conventions held by Irish nationalists. The majority were held in the United States and supported by Irish-American organisations, but others were held in Australia, Argentina, and France. Most related to the Irish Home Rule movement, but the two most recent conventions – in 1947 and 1994 – dealt with issues relating to Northern Ireland.

Places and dates
 1881 Chicago
 1896 Dublin
 1916 New York City
 1918 New York City
 1919 Philadelphia
 1921 Buenos Aires
 1922 Paris
 1947 New York City
 1994 New York City

The conventions' agendas

Chicago 1881
In 1880, Charles Stewart Parnell had visited Chicago and the American branch of the Irish National Land League was established there. The first Irish Race Convention was held on 30 November – 2 December 1881, following a Clan na Gael convention in August. It covered the recent emerging links between the more violent groups, such as the Fenians, the Land League and the growing Irish Home Rule movement that was led by Parnell. Organised by John F. Finerty, and attended by Home Rule MPs T. P. O'Connor and Tim Healy, the convention's Home Rule Fund had soon raised $500,000.

Philadelphia 1883
John Finerty listed a convention at Philadelphia, where the main business was establishing local branches of the American branch of the Irish National League. Alexander Sullivan of Chicago was elected President, and Finerty was elected that year for the predominently Irish Illinois's 2nd congressional district.

Dublin 1896
By 1896, two Home Rule Bills had been defeated in the London parliament, and the Home Rule movement had split over its support for Parnell. A Conservative and Liberal Unionist coalition was in power, both being firmly opposed to Home Rule. The main purpose of the convention was to try to re-unite the Redmond and Dillon factions that had divided the Irish Parliamentary Party in 1890.

Archbishop Walsh of Toronto had said: "Let a great National Convention be held in Dublin, composed of chosen representatives of the clergy and people of Ireland and of an advisory representation of the Irish race abroad." John Dillon on behalf of the INF replied: "That this party approves of the suggestion made by the Archbishop of Toronto in favour of a National Convention representative of the Irish race throughout the world."

Pope Leo XIII sent a blessing in Latin: "Sanctissimus, bonum spirituale et temporale Hibernorum exoptans, finem dissensionum precatur". The convention thanked him profusely: "The Irish Race Convention begs to express its profound gratitude to the Holy Father (i.e., the Pope) for his most kind and salutary message, which all the delegates receive as a signal favour, and as the happiest augury of peace."

A number of practical resolutions followed, primarily on the progress of land ownership reform. Eventually the Irish Parliamentary Party did reunite in 1900, chaired by Redmond, and achieved the enactment of the Home Rule Act 1914, but this was suspended for the duration of the First World War.

New York City 1916
The 1916 convention, comprising 2,300 delegates at the Hotel Astor, was held six weeks before the Easter Rising, and considered the division between the Home Rule parties and the more militant nationalists. The Rising would be supported by Clan na Gael, but other members remained hopeful that the 1914 Home Rule Act, which had been passed but suspended during World War I, might work.

A majority at the convention supported the American policy of neutrality during the war, and were opposed to any alliance with Britain. Woodrow Wilson won the 1916 United States presidential election with help from Irish-Americans and his campaign slogan: "He kept us out of War".

An important result was the formation of the "Friends of Irish Freedom" that worked as a co-ordinating body to support: "... the independence of Ireland, the industrial development of Ireland, the use and sale of Irish products, and to revive Irish culture."

New York City 1918
Held on 18–19 May, and organised by the Friends for Irish Freedom, this convention looked forward to the end of the world war, in which America was now an ally of Britain. The convention therefore had the difficult task of steering between its support for militant groups such as Sinn Féin, which was opposed to British rule in Ireland, and proclaiming the loyalty of Irish-Americans to the USA. America had enacted conscription in 1917, but the Irish Conscription Crisis of 1918 had recently arisen, unifying most nationalist parties in Ireland.

In America, the Hindu German Conspiracy Trial had just ended, revealing the link between Clan na Gael and the defendants. Public relations and selecting the convention chairman were therefore unusually important. This also caused an immediate division between John Devoy, who proposed the moderate Father Hurton, being mindful of the "hostile press", and Hanna Sheehy-Skeffington and Jim Larkin who proposed the more combative John Forrest Kelly. The convention ended with an address by Judge Goff to President Wilson, which was considered to be mild and conciliatory: "to take such measures as are best calculated to bring about the independence of Ireland".

Philadelphia 1919
This convention was held on 22–23 February, with 5,000 delegates, and discussed the success of Sinn Féin in the 1918 election, the declaration in January of the Irish Republic in Dublin, and the hope that America would support Irish participation at the forthcoming Paris peace conference. The principle of self-determination at article 5 in Wilson's Fourteen Points was expected to apply to Ireland. Much mention was made of the bravery of the "Fighting 69th" in the war. The hero of the hour was the American-born Irish republican leader Éamon de Valera.

The convention appointed the American Commission on Irish Independence to go to Europe to report and lobby; its members were Frank P. Walsh, Edward Fitzsimmons Dunne, and Michael J. Ryan. In the event, Irish participation at Paris was excluded, Woodrow Wilson refused his support, and in retaliation Irish pressure groups refused to vote as usual for the Democratic Party in the 1920 United States presidential election, partially causing Harding's victory.

A fund-raising drive by the Friends of Irish Freedom (FOIF) to sell bonds issued by the Irish Republic eventually raised over $5m., but disputes arose over the management of the money. The FOIF was led by John Devoy and Judge Cohalan (a judge of the New York Supreme Court), and believed that a sophisticated and conciliatory approach would ensure the best diplomatic support for Ireland at the Paris conference. De Valera and other Irish delegates expected the FOIF to demand and secure immediate recognition by the USA of the Irish Republic. A division on policy arose, Sinn Féin tried unsuccessfully to reform the FOIF and severed mutual links in October 1920.

In turn, the FOIF President Bishop Gallagher called de Valera a "foreign potentate", and Bishop Turner referred to him as the "Pancho Villa of Ireland". Membership of the FOIF soon declined from over 100,000 to less than 20,000.

Melbourne 1919
Held on 3 November 1919, this first Australian convention was chaired by Thomas Ryan KC, the Labor party Premier of Queensland. Archbishop Mannix read out messages he had exchanged with Arthur Griffith, and supported the Irish claim to sovereignty. Archbishop Redwood of New Zealand also attended. Monsignor Curran estimated that 1,000 delegates were present, and that the Irish "block vote" was then about 23% of the electorate.

Buenos Aires 1921
In 1921, Laurence Ginnell was sent to organise a smaller convention in Buenos Aires, Argentina. The effect was to link up with the expatriate Irish there, and to demonstrate the world-wide scope of the nationalist movement.

Paris 1922
In January 1922, the convention had to consider the Anglo-Irish Treaty that had just been ratified and which divided nationalist opinion. It was held in Paris to emphasise Ireland's emerging status as an independent state to the rest of Europe. The proposed Irish Free State was to be created in December 1922. The body organising the convention was named  which was to be made permanent and to be funded by the formative Irish government.

The Irish delegation was supposed to represent "the Irish people", but this comprised senior members of Sinn Féin who were for and against the treaty. Debate on the treaty turned on the definition of whether or not the treaty embodied Ireland's "full" right to independence. Those against the treaty said not; those in favour said it was a significant step towards full independence.

The Chair, Rev. Dr. O'Reilly was perplexed: "... at first he had not been able to understand how the word 'full' could be political, but he had now been enlightened by the speeches of Mr. de Valera's supporters." The Very Rev. T. J. Shanley said that Americans would still continue to help Ireland, and that: "... I am going back to America for one purpose and one alone, to go on the public platform to ask for money – and I'm going to get it – for guns and munitions to send to the men in Ireland who are prepared to carry out that fight for Ireland's absolute independence (Applause)."

The outcome was a rare moral victory for de Valera's anti-treaty followers; the seven-men executive committee had four of his nominees, while the pro-treaty side only had one of its candidates elected, Eoin MacNeill.

MacNeill deplored that: "... the undertaking obtained from Mr. de Valera that party politics should not be introduced into the Congress, and that its funds and machinery would not be applied to party purposes has already been violated in one important particular, and that the undertaking in which Mr. de Valera and his nominees went to Paris as part of the official Irish Delegation was violated by them."

In March 1922, de Valera proposed that the Second Dáil provide a £5000 loan to Fine Ghaedheal. A Dáil special committee considered the matter and reported in June, recommending a loan. The Dáil voted to accept the report without the loan.

New York City 1947
By this stage the Irish Free State was effectively a republic, and had remained neutral in World War II. The main issue in 1947 was to end the partition of Ireland.

America was supporting Britain through the Marshall Aid plan, and the solution was to make this aid conditional upon the end of partition. Congressman John E. Fogarty was the main mover. On 29 March 1950, he proposed the Fogarty Resolution as a part of the Marshall Plan Foreign Aid Bill, arguing that Northern Ireland was costing Britain $150,000,000 annually, and that American financial support for Britain was thereby prolonging the partition of Ireland. On 27 September 1951, Fogarty's resolution was defeated in Congress by 206 votes to 139, with 83 abstaining – a factor that swung some votes against his motion was that Ireland had remained neutral during World War II.

New York City 1994
This convention was organised for June at the Jacob Javits Convention Center by Dennis Prebenson, with Gerry Adams of Sinn Féin as its guest speaker. The "Troubles" that had developed since 1970 in Northern Ireland had not achieved Irish reunification. Earlier in 1994, President Bill Clinton had allowed Mr Adams his first US visa, based in part on an understanding that peaceful means could also be used to resolve the conflict. While trenchant and hoping for further Irish-American support, the convention helped prepare the ground for the August 1994 ceasefire, an essential step in the Northern Ireland peace process that led on to the 1998 Belfast Agreement.

Notes

Celtic nationalism
Independence movements
History of Ireland (1801–1923)
History of the Republic of Ireland
Irish-American history
American
Irish nationalism